Mikuláš of Kadaň (born 1350, Kadaň – died 1419, Prague)  was an Imperial clockmaker. The oldest part of the Orloj (which also known as Prague Astronomical Clock), the mechanical clock and astronomical dial, dates back to 1410, was designed by Mikuláš of Kadaň and Jan Šindel.  

The clock was modified by Master Hanuš, who was mistakenly identified as the creator of the clock in a legend related by Alois Jirásek.

See also 
 Astronomical clock

14th-century Bohemian people
15th-century Bohemian people
Engineers from Prague
People from Kadaň
1350 births
1419 deaths